Lina is a surname. Notable people with the surname include:

Dace Lina (born 1981), Latvian marathon runner
Joey Lina (born 1951), Filipino lawyer, businessman, and politician
Méddy Lina (born 1986), Guadeloupean footballer
Ria Lina (born 1989), British comedian, actress, and writer